Events in the year 1994 in the Netherlands.

Incumbents
 Monarch: Beatrix
 Prime Minister: Ruud Lubbers (until 22 August); Wim Kok (from 22 August)

Events
4 April – The KLM Cityhopper Flight 433 crashed during an emergency landing.
10 to 17 April – The 1994 European Badminton Championships were held in Den Bosch.
22 August – Wim Kok takes over as the new prime minister.

Births

 

10 February – Roel Mannaart, kickboxer
13 February – Danzell Gravenberch, footballer
17 February – Yasmin Verheijen, designer, model and beauty pageant titleholder
2 March – NikkieTutorials, makeup artist and beauty vlogger
20 March – Joshua Brenet, footballer
21 March – Kelly Dulfer, handball player. 
21 March – Arvid de Kleijn, cyclist.
22 March – Jean-Paul Boëtius, footballer
23 March – Jito Kok, basketball player
11 April – Duncan Laurence, singer-songwriter
29 April – Antwan Tolhoek, cyclist.
20 May – Abbey Hoes, film and television actress 
22 May – Kira Toussaint, competitive swimmer.
2 June – Dennis van Aarssen, singer
15 June – Vincent Janssen, footballer
16 June – Rezar, wrestler
21 June – Vincent de Vries, badminton player
24 June – Janieck Devy, singer-songwriter, musician and actor
2 July – Jason van Dalen, cyclist. 
22 July – Shane Hammink, basketball player
27 July – Boyan Slat, inventor and entrepreneur
28 July – Sven van Beek, footballer
1 August – Arjan Knipping, swimmer
17 August – Dai Dai Ntab, speed skater
6 September – D-Wayne, house music DJ and music producer 
12 September – Jeffrey Herlings, motocross rider
17 September – Inger Smits, handball player.
25 September – Kai Verbij, speed skater
15 October – Lil' Kleine, musician
14 November – Robin van Kampen, chess player.
24 November – Sylvana IJsselmuiden, model, television presenter and actress
18 December – Roosmarijn de Kok, fashion model
31 December – Tamara van Vliet, swimmer

Full date missing
Rahima Ayla Dirkse, model and beauty pageant titleholder
Nora El Koussour, actress

Deaths 

30 January – Jan Schaefer, politician (b. 1940)
19 February – Renske Vellinga, speed skater (b. 1974)
21 May – Johan Hendrik Weidner, war hero (b. 1912)
24 July – Leo Brongersma, zoologist, herpetologist, author, and lecturer (b. 1907)
23 September – Johannes van Damme, engineer and businessman (b. 1935)
c.9 September – Joop Wilhelmus, pornographer and entrepreneur (b. 1943)
14 September – David van de Kop, painter, draftsman and sculptor (b. 1937)
26 December – Joop Klant, economist, novelist and professor of political economy (b. 1915)

References

 
1990s in the Netherlands
Years of the 20th century in the Netherlands
Netherlands
Netherlands